Fruitdale is a district of San Jose, California, located in West San Jose, though some portions are still unincorporated as a census-designated place. The population of the CDP was 935 at the 2010 census.

Geography

Fruitdale is located at  (37.312743, -121.935837).  It is bordered on the north, west, and east by San Jose, California, and on the south by Campbell, California.

Demographics

2010
The 2010 United States Census reported that Fruitdale had a population of 935. The racial makeup of Fruitdale was 633 (67.7%) White, 31 (3.3%) African American, 11 (1.2%) Native American, 110 (11.8%) Asian, 4 (0.4%) Pacific Islander, 88 (9.4%) from other races, and 58 (6.2%) from two or more races. Hispanic or Latino of any race were 244 persons (26.1%).

The Census reported that 861 people (92.1% of the population) lived in households, 26 (2.8%) lived in non-institutionalized group quarters, and 48 (5.1%) were institutionalized.

There were 361 households, out of which 92 (25.5%) had children under the age of 18 living in them, 135 (37.4%) were opposite-sex married couples living together, 39 (10.8%) had a female householder with no husband present, 25 (6.9%) had a male householder with no wife present.  There were 24 (6.6%) unmarried opposite-sex partnerships, and 5 (1.4%) same-sex married couples or partnerships. 118 households (32.7%) were made up of individuals, and 29 (8.0%) had someone living alone who was 65 years of age or older. The average household size was 2.39.  There were 199 families (55.1% of all households); the average family size was 3.11.

The population was spread out, with 171 people (18.3%) under the age of 18, 80 people (8.6%) aged 18 to 24, 271 people (29.0%) aged 25 to 44, 325 people (34.8%) aged 45 to 64, and 88 people (9.4%) who were 65 years of age or older.  The median age was 41.7 years. For every 100 females, there were 100.2 males.  For every 100 females age 18 and over, there were 97.9 males.

The homeowner vacancy rate was 1.0%; the rental vacancy rate was 2.9%.  507 people (54.2% of the population) lived in owner-occupied housing units and 354 people (37.9%) lived in rental housing units.

2000
As of the census of 2000, there were 895 people, 348 households, and 212 families residing in the CDP.  The population density was 1,279.9/km2 (3,364.9/mi2).  There were 356 housing units at an average density of 509.1/km2 (1,338.4/mi2).  The racial makeup of the CDP was 76.54% White, 1.90% African American, 1.12% Native American, 5.47% Asian, 0.34% Pacific Islander, 7.15% from other races, and 7.49% from two or more races. Hispanic or Latino of any race were 16.76% of the population.

There were 348 households, out of which 30.7% had children under the age of 18 living with them, 46.8% were married couples living together, 10.6% had a female householder with no husband present, and 38.8% were non-families. 28.2% of all households were made up of individuals, and 7.2% had someone living alone who was 65 years of age or older.  The average household size was 2.49 and the average family size was 3.07.

In the CDP, the population was spread out, with 21.8% under the age of 18, 6.6% from 18 to 24, 39.1% from 25 to 44, 22.7% from 45 to 64, and 9.8% who were 65 years of age or older.  The median age was 37 years. For every 100 females, there were 95.4 males.  For every 100 females age 18 and over, there were 94.4 males.

The median income for a household in the CDP was $58,750, and the median income for a family was $94,224. Males had a median income of $45,781 versus $37,031 for females. The per capita income for the CDP was $30,724.  About 3.0% of families and 6.6% of the population were below the poverty line, including 4.2% of those under age 18 and 25.0% of those age 65 or over.

Landmarks
San Jose City College
Santa Clara Valley Medical Center

References

External links

Census-designated places in Santa Clara County, California
Census-designated places in California